List of notable Karen people:
 Cynthia Maung, doctor, winner of the Ramon Magsaysay Award
 General Bo Mya, (1927–2006), Commander of the Karen National Union and former Chairman of the National Council of the Union of Burma
 Johnny and Luther Htoo, boy soldiers
 Naw Zipporrah Sein, Karen political activist
 Tin Soe, political prisoner
 Naw Phaw Eh Htar, Karen actress

Karen
Karen